Anne or Ann Smith may refer to:

Arts and media
Anne Smith (silversmith) ( 1770s), English silversmith
Ann Eliza Smith (1819–1905), American author and patriot
Anne Mollegen Smith, American magazine editor and writer
Anne Smith ( 1955), actress in The Time of His Life

Sport
Anne Smith (runner) (1941–1993), British middle-distance runner
Anne Smith (footballer) (born 1951), New Zealand footballer
Anne Smith (tennis) (born 1959), American tennis player

Other fields
Ann Smith (activist) ( 1682–1686), funded Argyll's Rising and Monmouth Rebellion
Lady Anne Smith (1775–1844), sister of Arthur Wellesley, 1st Duke of Wellington
Dame Anne Beadsmore Smith (1869–1960), British Army nurse
Anne Ripley Smith (1881–1949), co-founder of Alcoholics Anonymous
Anne Briar Smith (1940–2016), New Zealand children's rights researcher
Ann Alexander Smith (born 1947), Louisiana educator
Anne Smith, Lady Smith (born 1955), Scottish Supreme Court judge

Fictional characters
Ann Smith, a character in Mr. & Mrs. Smith

See also
Anne Easter Smith, English-American historical novelist
Ann Smith Franklin (1696–1763), American newspaper printer and publisher
Anna Smith (disambiguation)
Annie Smith (disambiguation)